People named Schlözer:
 August Ludwig von Schlözer (1735–1809), German historian
 Dorothea von Rodde-Schlözer
 Paul de Schlözer (1842–1898), Polish or Russian pianist and teacher
 Kurd von Schlözer (1822–1894), German historian and diplomat
 Boris de Schlözer (1881–1969), Russian writer and musicologist

Surnames